Of Good Stock is a play written by Melissa Ross and directed by Lynne Meadow. It premiered at Manhattan Theatre Club's off Broadway Mainstage in June 2015.

Synopsis
The play centres around three sisters, and the men in their lives, who gather at their family home for a summer weekend. Their reunion ignites passion, humour and unanticipated upheavals.

Cast
 Alicia Silverstone
 Heather Lind
 Jennifer Mudge
 Kelly AuCoin
 Nate Miller
 Greg Keller

References

External links
 Official website
 Manhattan Theatre Club website

2015 plays
American plays